In 1911, the conquest of Morocco was initiated by the French Third Republic, in the aftermath of the Agadir Crisis. While the conquest itself lasted until 1934, the Treaty of Fes was signed on 30 March 1912. According to the treaty, most of Morocco would become a French protectorate from 1912 to 1956, when the country regained its independence.

List

(Dates in italics indicate de facto continuation of office)

See also
 Beylik of Tunis
 French protectorate of Tunisia
 List of French residents-general in Tunisia
 Kingdom of Tunisia
 French Algeria
 List of French governors of Algeria
 Spanish protectorate in Morocco
 List of Spanish high commissioners in Morocco

Sources
 http://www.rulers.org/rulm2.html#morocco
 African States and Rulers, John Stewart, McFarland
 Heads of State and Government, 2nd Edition, John V da Graca, MacMillan Press (2000)

French residents-general
French residents-general

French